The Chiriaco (from Quechua Chiri Yaku, chiri cold, yaku water, "cold water") is a river in Peru. It is a tributary of the Marañón and takes Tuntungos, Shushug and Wawas as principal tributaries.

In 2016, a large oil spill from Petroperú's pipeline contaminated Chiriaco.

References 

Rivers of Peru
Rivers of Amazonas Region
Rivers of Loreto Region